Muhammad Omar (born 2 June 1990) is a Pakistani footballer, who plays as a goalkeeper for National Bank.

He made his international debut 2012 AFC Challenge Cup qualifications against Turkmenistan, where he was substituted off at 78th minute for Amir Gul. Omar has not appeared for the country since.

Honours

Club
National Bank
 National Football Challenge Cup: 2013

Individual
 Goalkeeper of the year: 2010–11

References

Living people
Pakistani footballers
Pakistan international footballers
1990 births
Association football goalkeepers